French art consists of the visual and plastic arts (including French architecture, woodwork, textiles, and ceramics) originating from the geographical area of France. Modern France was the main centre for the European art of the Upper Paleolithic, then left many megalithic monuments, and in the Iron Age many of the most impressive finds of early Celtic art. The Gallo-Roman period left a distinctive provincial style of sculpture, and the region around the modern Franco-German border led the empire in the mass production of finely decorated Ancient Roman pottery, which was exported to Italy and elsewhere on a large scale.  With Merovingian art the story of French styles as a distinct and influential element in the wider development of the art of Christian Europe begins.

France can fairly be said to have been a leader in the development of Romanesque art and Gothic art, before the Renaissance led to Italy becoming the main source of stylistic developments until France matched Italy's influence during the Rococo and Neoclassicism periods and then regained the leading role in the Arts from the 19th to the mid-20th century.

Historic overview

Prehistory

Currently, the earliest known European art is from the Upper Palaeolithic period of between 40,000 and 10,000 years ago and France has a large selection of extant pre-historic art from the Châtelperronian, Aurignacian, Solutrean, Gravettian, and Magdalenian cultures. This art includes cave paintings, such as the famous paintings at Pech Merle in the Lot in Languedoc which date back to 16,000 BC, Lascaux, located near the village of Montignac, in the Dordogne, dating back to between 13,000 and 15,000 BC, or perhaps, as far back as 25,000 BC, the Cosquer Cave, the Chauvet Cave dating back to 29,000 BC, and the Trois-Frères cave; and portable art, such as animal carvings and great goddess statuettes called Venus figurines, such as the "Venus of Brassempouy" of 21,000 BC, discovered in the Landes, now in the museum at the Château de Saint-Germain-en-Laye or the Venus of Lespugue at the Musée de l'Homme. Ornamental beads, bone pins, carvings, as well as flint and stone arrowheads also are among the prehistoric objects from the area of France.

Speculations exist that only Homo sapiens are capable of artistic expression, however, a recent find, the Mask of la Roche-Cotard—a Mousterian or Neanderthal artifact, found in 2002 in a cave near the banks of the Loire River, dating back to about 33,000 B.C.—now suggests that Neanderthal humans may have developed a sophisticated and complex artistic tradition.

In the Neolithic period (see Neolithic Europe), megalithic (large stone) monuments, such as the dolmens and menhirs at Carnac, Saint-Sulpice-de-Faleyrens and elsewhere in France begin to appear; this appearance is thought to start in the fifth millennium BC, although some authors speculate about Mesolithic roots. In France there are some 5,000 megalithics monuments, mainly in Brittany, where there is the largest concentration of these monuments. In this area there is wide variety of these monuments that have been well preserved, like menhirs, dolmen, cromlechs and cairns. The Cairn of Gavrinis in southern Brittany is an outstanding example of megalithic art : its 14 meters inner corridor is nearly completely adorned with ornamental carvings. The great broken menhir of Er-Grah, now in four pieces was more than 20 meters high originally, making it the largest menhir ever erected. France has also numerous painted stones, polished stone axes, and inscribed menhirs from this period. The Grand-Pressigny area was known for its precious silex blades and they were extensively exported during the Neolithic.

In France from the Neolithic to the Bronze Age, one finds a variety of archaeological cultures, including the Rössen culture of c. 4500–4000 BC, Beaker culture of c. 2800–1900 BC, Tumulus culture of c. 1600–1200 BC, Urnfield culture of c. 1300–800 BC, and, in a transition to the Iron Age, Hallstatt culture of c. 1200–500 BC.

For more on Prehistoric sites in Western France, see Prehistory of Brittany.

Celtic and Roman periods

From the Proto-Celtic Urnfield and Hallstat cultures, a continental Iron Age Celtic art developed; mainly associated with La Tène culture, which flourished during the late Iron Age from 450 BC to the Roman conquest in the first century BC. This art drew on native, classical and perhaps, the Mediterranean, oriental sources. The Celts of Gaul are known through numerous tombs and burial mounds found throughout France.

Celtic art is very ornamental, avoiding straight lines and only occasionally using symmetry, without the imitation of nature nor ideal of beauty central to the classical tradition, but apparently, often involves complex symbolism. This artwork includes a variety of styles and often incorporates subtly modified elements from other cultures, an example being the characteristic over-and-under interlacing which arrived in France only in the sixth century, although it was already used by Germanic artists. The Celtic Vix grave in present-day Burgundy revealed the largest bronze crater of the Antiquity, that was probably imported by Celtic aristocrats from Greece.

The region of Gaul came under the rule of the Roman Empire from the first century BC to the fifth century AD. Southern France, and especially Provence and Languedoc, is known for its many intact Gallo-Roman monuments. Lugdunum, modern Lyon, was at the time of the Roman Empire the largest city outside Italy and gave birth to two Roman Emperors. The city still boasts some Roman remains including a Theater. Monumental works from this period include the amphitheater in Orange, Vaucluse, the "Maison Carrée" at Nîmes which is one of the best preserved Roman temples in Europe, the city of Vienne near Lyon, which features an exceptionally well preserved temple (the temple of Augustus and Livia), a circus as well as other remains, the Pont du Gard aqueduct which is also in an exceptional state of preservation, the Roman cities of Glanum and Vaison-la-Romaine, two intact Gallo-Roman arenas in Nîmes and Arles, and the Roman baths, and the arena of Paris.

Medieval period

Merovingian art

Merovingian art is the art and architecture of the Merovingian dynasty of the Franks, which lasted from the fifth century to the eighth century in present-day France and Germany. The advent of the Merovingian dynasty in Gaul during the fifth century led to important changes in the arts. In architecture, there was no longer the desire to build robust and harmonious buildings. Sculpture regressed to being little more than a simple technique for the ornamentation of sarcophagi, altars, and ecclesiastical furniture. On the other hand, the rise of gold work and manuscript illumination brought about a resurgence of Celtic decoration, which, with Christian and other contributions, constitutes the basis of Merovingian art. The unification of the Frankish kingdom under Clovis I (465–511) and his successors, corresponded with the need to build churches. The plans for them probably were copied from Roman basilicas. Unfortunately, these timber structures have not survived because of destruction by fire, whether accidental or caused by the Normans at the time of their incursions.

Carolingian art

Carolingian art is the approximate 120-year period from 750 to 900—during the reign of Charles Martel, Pippin the Younger, Charlemagne, and his immediate heirs—popularly known as the Carolingian Renaissance. The Carolingian era is the first period of the Medieval art movement known as Pre-Romanesque. For the first time, Northern European kings patronized classical Mediterranean Roman art forms, blending classical forms with Germanic ones, creating entirely new innovations in figurine line drawing, and setting the stage for the rise of Romanesque art and, eventually, Gothic art in the West.

Illuminated manuscripts, metalwork, small-scale sculpture, mosaics, and frescos survive from the period. The Carolingians also undertook major architectural building campaigns at numerous churches in France. These include, those of Metz, Lyon, Vienne, Le Mans, Reims, Beauvais, Verdun, Saint-Germain in Auxerre, Saint-Pierre in Flavigny, and Saint-Denis, as well as the town center of Chartres. The Centula Abbey of Saint-Riquier (Somme), completed in 788, was a major achievement in monastic architecture. Another important building (mostly lost today) was "Theodulf's Villa" in Germigny-des-Prés.

With the end of Carolingian rule around 900, artistic production halted for almost three generations. After the demise of the Carolingian Empire, France split into a number of feuding provinces, lacking any organized patronage. French art of the tenth and eleventh centuries was produced by local monasteries to promote literacy and piety, however, the primitive styles produced were not so highly skilled as the techniques of the earlier Carolingian period.

Multiple regional styles developed based on the chance availability of Carolingian manuscripts as models to copy, and the availability of itinerant artists. The monastery of Saint Bertin became an important center under its abbot Odbert (986–1007), who created a new style based on Anglo-Saxon and Carolingian forms. The nearby abbey of St. Vaast (Pas-de-Calais) also created a number of important works. In southwestern France a number of manuscripts were produced c. 1000, at the monastery of Saint Martial in Limoges, as well as at Albi, Figeac, and Saint-Sever-de-Rustan in Gascony. In Paris a unique style developed at the abbey of Saint-Germain-des-Prés. In Normandy a new style arose in 975. By the later tenth century with the Cluny reform movement and a revived spirit for the concept of Empire, art production resumed.

Romanesque art

Romanesque art refers to the art of Western Europe during a period of one hundred and fifty years, from approximately 1000 AD to the rise of the Gothic style, which arose in the middle of the twelfth century in France. "Romanesque Art" was marked by a renewed interest in Roman construction techniques. For example, the twelfth-century capitals on the cloister of Saint-Guilhem-le-Désert, adopt an acanthus-leaf motif and the decorative use of drill holes, which were commonly found on Roman monuments. Other important Romanesque buildings in France include the abbey of Saint-Benoît-sur-Loire in Loiret, the churches of Saint-Foy in Conques of Aveyron, Saint-Martin in Tours, Saint-Philibert in Tournus of Saône-et-Loire, Saint-Remi in Reims, and Saint-Sernin in Toulouse. In particular, Normandy experienced a large building campaign in the churches of Bernay, Mont-Saint-Michel, Coutances Cathedral, and Bayeux.

Most Romanesque sculpture was integrated into church architecture, not only for aesthetic, but also for structural purposes. Small-scale sculpture during the pre-Romanesque period was influenced by Byzantine and Early Christian sculpture. Other elements were adopted from various local styles of Middle Eastern countries. Motifs were derived from the arts of the "barbarian," such as grotesque figures, beasts, and geometric patterns, which were all important additions, particularly in the regions north of the Alps. Among the important sculptural works of the period are the ivory carvings at the monastery of Saint Gall. Monumental sculpture was rarely practised separately from architecture in the Pre-Romanesque period. For the first time after the fall of the Roman empire, monumental sculpture emerged as a significant art form. Covered church façades, doorways, and capitals all increased and expanded in size and importance, as in the Last Judgment Tympanum, Beaulieu-sur-Dordogne, and the Standing Prophet at Moissac. Monumental doors, baptismal fonts, and candle holders, frequently decorated with scenes from biblical history, were cast in bronze, attesting to the skills of the contemporary metalworkers. Frescoes were applied to the vaults and walls of churches. Rich textiles and precious objects in gold and silver, such as chalices and reliquaries, were produced in increasing numbers to meet the needs of the liturgy, and to serve the cult of the saints. In the twelfth century, large-scale stone sculpture spread throughout Europe. In the French Romanesque churches of Provence, Burgundy, and Aquitaine, sculptures adorned the façades and statues were incorporated into the capitals.

Gothic

Gothic art and architecture were products of a Medieval art movement that lasted about three hundred years. It began in France, developing from the Romanesque period in the mid-twelfth century. By the late fourteenth century, it had evolved toward a more secular and natural style known as, International Gothic, which continued until the late fifteenth century, when it evolved further, into Renaissance art. The primary Gothic art media were sculpture, panel painting, stained glass, fresco, and illuminated manuscript.

Gothic architecture was born in the middle of the twelfth century in Île-de-France, when Abbot Suger built the abbey at St. Denis, c. 1140, considered the first Gothic building, and soon afterward, the Chartres Cathedral, c. 1145. Prior to this, there had been no sculpture tradition in Île-de-France—so sculptors were brought in from Burgundy, who created the revolutionary figures acting as columns in the Western (Royal) Portal of Chartres Cathedral (see image) —it was an entirely new invention in French art, and would provide the model for a generation of sculptors. Other notable Gothic churches in France include Bourges Cathedral, Amiens Cathedral, Notre-Dame de Laon, Notre Dame in Paris, Reims Cathedral, the Sainte-Chapelle in Paris, Strasbourg Cathedral.

The designations of styles in French Gothic architecture are as follows: Early Gothic, High Gothic, Rayonnant, and Late Gothic or "Flamboyant". Division into these divisions is effective, but debatable. Because Gothic cathedrals were built over several successive periods, and the artisans of each period not necessarily following the wishes of previous periods, the dominant architectural style often changed during the building of a particular building. Consequently, it is difficult to declare one building as belonging to certain era of Gothic architecture. It is more useful to use the terms as descriptors for specific elements within a structure, rather than applying it to the building as a whole.

The French ideas spread. Gothic sculpture evolved from the early stiff and elongated style, still partly Romanesque, into a spatial and naturalistic treatment in the late twelfth and early thirteenth century. Influences from surviving ancient Greek and Roman sculptures were incorporated into the treatment of drapery, facial expression, and pose of the Dutch-Burgundian sculptor, Claus Sluter, and the taste for naturalism first signaled the end of Gothic sculpture, evolving into the classicistic Renaissance style by the end of the fifteenth century.

Painting in a style that may be called, "Gothic," did not appear until about 1200, nearly fifty years after the start of Gothic architecture and sculpture. The transition from Romanesque to Gothic is very imprecise and by no means clearly delineated, but one may see the beginning of a style that is more somber, dark, and emotional than the previous period. This transition occurs first in England and France around 1200, in Germany around 1220, and in Italy around 1300. Painting, the representation of images on a surface, was practiced during the Gothic period in four primary crafts, frescos, panel paintings, manuscript illumination, and stained glass. Frescoes continued to be used as the main pictorial narrative craft on church walls in southern Europe as a continuation of early Christian and Romanesque traditions. In the north, stained glass remained the dominant art form until the fifteenth century. At the end of the 14th century and during the 15th century French princely courts like those of the dukes of Burgundy, the duke of Anjou or the duke of Berry as well as the pope and the cardinals in Avignon employed renowned painters, like the Limbourg Brothers, Barthélemy d'Eyck, Enguerrand Quarton or Jean Fouquet, who developed the so-called International Gothic style that spread through Europe and incorporated the new Flemish influence as well as the innovations of the Italian early Renaissance artists.

Early Modern period

In the late fifteenth century, the French invasion of Italy and the proximity of the vibrant Burgundy court, with its Flemish connections, brought the French into contact with the goods, paintings, and the creative spirit of the Northern and Italian Renaissance. Initial artistic changes at that time in France were executed by Italian and Flemish artists, such as Jean Clouet and his son François Clouet, along with the Italians, Rosso Fiorentino, Francesco Primaticcio, and Niccolò dell'Abbate of what is often called the first School of Fontainebleau from 1531. Leonardo da Vinci also was invited to France by François I, but other than the paintings which he brought with him, he produced little for the French king.

The art of the period from François I through Henri IV often is heavily inspired by late Italian pictorial and sculptural developments commonly referred to as Mannerism, which is associated with the later works of Michelangelo as well as Parmigianino, among others. It is characterized by figures which are elongated and graceful that rely upon visual rhetoric, including the elaborate use of allegory and mythology. Perhaps the greatest accomplishment of the French Renaissance was the construction of the Châteaux of the Loire Valley. No longer conceived of as fortresses, such pleasure palaces took advantage of the richness of the rivers and lands of the Loire region and they show remarkable architectural skill.

Baroque and Classicism

The seventeenth century marked a golden age for French art in all fields.
In the early part of the seventeenth century, late mannerist and early Baroque tendencies continued to flourish in the court of Marie de Medici and Louis XIII.
Art from this period shows influences from both the north of Europe, namely the Dutch and Flemish schools, and from Roman painters of the Counter-Reformation. Artists in France frequently debated the contrasting merits of Peter Paul Rubens with his Flemish baroque, voluptuous lines and colors to Nicolas Poussin with his rational control, proportion, Roman classicist baroque style. Another proponent of classicism working in Rome was Claude Gellée, known as Le Lorrain, who defined the form of classical landscape.

Many young French painters of the beginning of the century went to Rome to train themselves and soon assimilated Caravaggio's influence like Valentin de Boulogne and Simon Vouet. The later is credited with bringing the baroque in France and at his return in Paris in 1627 he was named first painter of the king. But French painting soon departed from the extravagance and naturalism of the Italian baroque and painters like Eustache Le Sueur and Laurent de La Hyre, following Poussin example developed a classicist way known as Parisian Atticism, inspired by Antiquity, and focusing on proportion, harmony and the importance of drawing. Even Vouet, after his return from Italy, changed his manner to a more measured but still highly decorative and elegant style.
 

But at the same time there was still a strong Caravaggisti Baroque school represented in the period by the amazing candle-lit paintings of Georges de La Tour. The wretched and the poor were featured in a quasi-Dutch manner in the paintings by the three Le Nain brothers. In the paintings of Philippe de Champaigne there are both propagandistic portraits of Louis XIII' s minister Cardinal Richelieu and other more contemplative portraits of people in the Catholic Jansenist sect.

In architecture, architects like Salomon de Brosse, François Mansart and Jacques Lemercier helped define the French form of the baroque, developing the formula of the urban hôtel particulier that was to influence all of Europe and strongly departed from the Italian equivalent, the palazzo. Many aristocratic castles were rebuilt in the new classic-baroque style, some of the most famous being Maisons and Cheverny, characterized by high roofs "à la française" and a form that retained the medieval model of the castle adorned with prominent towers.

From the mid to late seventeenth century, French art is more often referred to by the term "Classicism" which implies an adherence to certain rules of proportion and sobriety uncharacteristic of the Baroque, as it was practiced in most of the rest of Europe during the same period. Under Louis XIV, the Baroque as it was practiced in Italy, was not in French taste, for instance, as Bernini's famous proposal for redesigning the Louvre was rejected by Louis XIV. Through propaganda, wars, and great architectural works, Louis XIV launched a vast program designed for the glorification of France and his name. The Palace of Versailles, initially a tiny hunting lodge built by his father, was transformed by Louis XIV into a marvelous palace for fêtes and parties, under the direction of architects Louis Le Vau (who had also built the château de Vaux-le-Vicomte) and Jules Hardouin Mansart (who built the church of the Invalides in Paris), painter and designer Charles Le Brun, and the landscape architect André Le Nôtre who perfected the rational form of the French garden that from Versailles spread in all of Europe.

For sculpture Louis XIV's reign also proved an important moment thanks to the King's protection of artists like Pierre Puget, François Girardon and Antoine Coysevox. In Rome, Pierre Legros, working in a more baroque manner, was one of the most influential sculptors of the end of the century.

Rococo and Neoclassicism

Rococo and Neoclassicism are terms used to describe the visual and plastic arts and architecture in Europe from the early eighteenth century to the end of the eighteenth century. In France, the death of Louis XIV in 1715 lead to a period of freedom commonly called the Régence. Versailles was abandoned from 1715 to 1722, the young king Louis XV and the government led by the duke of Orléans residing in Paris. There a new style emerged in the decorative arts, known as rocaille : the asymmetry and dynamism of the baroque was kept but renewed in a style that is less rhetoric and with less pompous effects, a deeper research of artificiality and use of motifs inspired by nature. This manner used to decorate rooms and furniture also existed in painting. Rocaillle painting turned toward lighters subjects, like the "fêtes galantes", theater settings, pleasant mythological narratives and the female nude. Most of the times the moralising sides of myths or history paintings are omitted and the accent is put on the decorative and pleasant aspect of the scenes depicted. Paintings from the period show an emphasis more on color than drawing, with apparent brush strokes and very colorful scenes. Important French painters from this period include Antoine Watteau, considered the inventor of the fête galante, Nicolas Lancret and François Boucher, known for his gentle pastoral and galant scenes. Pastel portrait painting became particularly fashionable in Europe at the time and France was the major center of activity for pastellists, with the prominent figures of Maurice Quentin de La Tour, Jean-Baptiste Perronneau and the Swiss Jean-Étienne Liotard.

The Louis XV style of decoration, although already apparent at the end of the last reign, was lighter with pastel colors, wood panels, smaller rooms, less gilding, and fewer brocades; shells, garlands, and occasional Chinese subjects predominated. The Chantilly, Vincennes and then Sèvres manufactures produced some of the finest porcelain of the time. The highly skilled ébénistes, cabinet-makers mostly based in Paris, created elaborate pieces of furniture with precious wood and bronze ornaments that were to be highly praised and imitated in all of Europe. The most famous are Jean-François Oeben, who created the work desk of king Louis XV in Versailles, Bernard II van Risamburgh and Jean-Henri Riesener. Highly skilled artists, called the ciseleur-doreurs, specialized in bronze ornaments for furniture and other pieces of decorative arts - the most famous being Pierre Gouthière and Pierre-Philippe Thomire. Talented silversmiths like Thomas Germain and his son François-Thomas Germain created elaborate silverware services that were highly praised by the various royalties of Europe. Rooms in châteaux and hôtels particuliers were more intimate than during the reign of Louis XIV and were decorated with rocaille style boiseries (carved wood panels covering the walls of a room) conceived by architects like Germain Boffrand and Gilles-Marie Oppenord or ornemanistes (designers of decorative objects) like Juste-Aurèle Meissonnier. 
The most prominent architects of the first half of the century were, apart Boffrand, Robert de Cotte and Ange-Jacques Gabriel, who designed public squares like the place de la Concorde in Paris and the place de la Bourse in Bordeaux in a style consciously inspired by that of the era of Louis XIV. During the first half of the century, France replaced Italy as the artistic centre and main artistic influence in Europe and many French artists worked in other courts across the continent.

The latter half of the eighteenth century continued to see French preeminence in Europe, particularly through the arts and sciences, and the speaking the French language was expected for members of the European courts. The French academic system continued to produce artists, but some, such as Jean-Honoré Fragonard and Jean-Baptiste-Siméon Chardin, explored new and increasingly impressionist styles of painting with thick brushwork. Although the hierarchy of genres continued to be respected officially, genre painting, landscape, portrait, and still life were extremely fashionable. Chardin and Jean-Baptiste Oudry were hailed for their still lives although this was officially considered the lowest of all genres in the hierarchy of painting subjects.

One also finds in this period a Pre-romanticist aspect. Hubert Robert's images of ruins, inspired by Italian capriccio paintings, are typical in this respect as well as the image of storms and moonlight marines by Claude Joseph Vernet. So too the change from the rational and geometrical French garden of André Le Nôtre to the English garden, which emphasized artificially wild and irrational nature. One also finds in some of these gardens—curious ruins of temples—called "follies".

The last half of the eighteenth century saw a turn to Neoclassicism in France, that is to say a conscious use of Greek and Roman forms and iconography. This movement was promoted by intellectuals like Diderot, in reaction to the artificiality and the decorative essence of the rocaille style. In painting, the greatest representative of this style is Jacques-Louis David, who, mirroring the profiles of Greek vases, emphasized the use of the profile. His subject matter often involved classical history such as the death of Socrates and Brutus. The dignity and subject matter of his paintings were greatly inspired by the works of Nicolas Poussin from the seventeenth century. Poussin and David were in turn major influences on Jean Auguste Dominique Ingres. Other important neoclassical painters of the period are Jean-Baptiste Greuze, Joseph-Marie Vien and, in the portrait genre, Élisabeth Louise Vigée Le Brun. Neoclassicism also penetrated decorative arts and architecture.

Architects like Ledoux and Boullée developed a radical style of neoclassical architecture based on simple and pure geometrical forms with a research of simetry and harmony, elaborating visionary projects like the complex of the Saltworks of Arc-et-Senans by Ledoux, a model of an ideal factory developed from the rational concepts of the Enlightment thinkers.

Modern period

19th century

The French Revolution and the Napoleonic wars brought great changes to the arts in France. The program of exaltation and myth making attendant to the Emperor Napoleon I of France was closely coordinated in the paintings of David, Gros and Guérin. Jean-Auguste-Dominique Ingres was the main figure of neoclassicism until the 1850s and a prominent teacher, giving priority to drawing over color. Meanwhile, Orientalism, Egyptian motifs, the tragic anti-hero, the wild landscape, the historical novel, and scenes from the Middle Ages and the Renaissance—all these elements of Romanticism—created a vibrant period that defies easy classification. The most important romantic painter of the period was Eugène Delacroix, who had a successful public career and was the main opponent of Ingres. Before him, Théodore Géricault opened the path to romanticism with his monumental Raft of the Medusa exposed at the 1819 Salon. Camille Corot tried to escape the conventional and idealized form of landscape painting influenced by classicism to be more realist and sensible to atmospheric variations at the same time.

Romantic tendencies continued throughout the century, both idealized landscape painting and Realism have their seeds in Romanticism. The work of Gustave Courbet and the Barbizon school are logical developments from it, as is the late nineteenth century Symbolism of such painters as Gustave Moreau, the professor of Henri Matisse and Georges Rouault, as well as Odilon Redon.

Academic painting developed at the Ecole des Beaux-Arts was the most successful with the public and the State : highly trained painters like Jean-Léon Gérôme, William Bouguereau and Alexandre Cabanel painted historical scenes inspired by the antique, following the footsteps of Ingres and the neoclassics. Though criticized for their conventionalism by the young avant-garde painters and critics, the most talented of the Academic painters renewed the historical genre, drawing inspiration from multiple cultures and techniques, like the Orient and the new framings made possible by the invention of photography

For many critics Édouard Manet wrote of the nineteenth century and the modern period (much as Charles Baudelaire does in poetry). His rediscovery of Spanish painting from the golden age, his willingness to show the unpainted canvas, his exploration of the forthright nude, and his radical brush strokes are the first steps toward Impressionism. Impressionism would take the Barbizon school one step farther, rejecting once and for all a belabored style and the use of mixed colors and black, for fragile transitive effects of light as captured outdoors in changing light (partly inspired by the paintings of J. M. W. Turner and Eugène Boudin). It led to Claude Monet with his cathedrals and haystacks, Pierre-Auguste Renoir with both his early outdoor festivals and his later feathery style of ruddy nudes, Edgar Degas with his dancers and bathers. Other important impressionists were Alfred Sisley, Camille Pissarro and Gustave Caillebotte.

After that threshold was crossed, the next thirty years became a litany of amazing experiments. Vincent van Gogh, Dutch born, but living in France, opened the road to expressionism. Georges Seurat, influenced by color theory, devised a pointillist technique that governed the Impressionist experiment and was followed by Paul Signac. Paul Cézanne, a painter's painter, attempted a geometrical exploration of the world, that left many of his peers indifferent. Paul Gauguin, a banker, found symbolism in Brittany  along Émile Bernard and then exoticism and primitivism in French Polynesia. These painters were referred to as Post-Impressionists.  Les Nabis, a movement of the 1890s, regrouping painters such as Paul Sérusier, Pierre Bonnard, Édouard Vuillard and Maurice Denis, was influenced by Gauguin's example in Brittany: they explored a decorative art in flat plains with the graphic approach of a Japanese print. They preached that a work of art is the end product and the visual expression of an artist's synthesis of nature in personal aesthetic metaphors and symbols. 
Henri Rousseau, the self-taught dabbling postmaster, became the model for the naïve revolution.

20th century

The early years of the twentieth century were dominated by experiments in colour and content that Impressionism and Post-Impressionism had unleashed. The products of the far east also brought new influences.  At roughly the same time, Les Fauves (Henri Matisse, André Derain, Maurice de Vlaminck, Albert Marquet, Raoul Dufy, Othon Friesz, Charles Camoin, Henri Manguin) exploded into color, much like German Expressionism.

The discovery of African tribal masks by Pablo Picasso, a Spaniard living in Paris, lead him to create his Les Demoiselles d'Avignon of 1907. Working independently, Picasso and Georges Braque returned to and refined Cézanne's way of rationally comprehension of objects in a flat medium, their experiments in cubism also would lead them to integrate all aspects and objects of day-to-day life, collage of newspapers, musical instruments, cigarettes, wine, and other objects into their works. Cubism in all its phases would dominate paintings of Europe and America for the next ten years. (See the article on Cubism for a complete discussion.)

World War I did not stop the dynamic creation of art in France. In 1916 a group of discontents met in a bar in Zurich, the Cabaret Voltaire, and created the most radical gesture possible, the anti-art of Dada. At the same time, Francis Picabia and Marcel Duchamp were exploring similar notions. At a 1917 art show in New York, Duchamp presented a white porcelain urinal (Fountain) signed R. Mutt as work of art, becoming the father of the readymade.

When Dada reached Paris, it was avidly embraced by a group of young artists and writers who were fascinated with the writings of Sigmund Freud, particularly by his notion of the unconscious mind. The provocative spirit of Dada became linked to the exploration of the unconscious mind through the use of automatic writing, chance operations, and, in some cases, altered states. The surrealists quickly turned to painting and sculpture. The shock of unexpected elements, the use of Frottage, collage, and decalcomania, the rendering of mysterious landscapes and dreamed images were to become the key techniques through the rest of the 1930s.

Immediately after this war the French art scene diverged roughly in two directions. There were those who continued in the artistic experiments from before the war, especially surrealism, and others who adopted the new Abstract Expressionism and action painting from New York, executing them in a French manner using Tachism or L'art informel. Parallel to both of these tendencies, Jean Dubuffet dominated the early post-war years while exploring childlike drawings, graffiti, and cartoons in a variety of media.

The late 1950s and early 1960s in France saw art forms that might be considered Pop Art. Yves Klein had attractive nude women roll around in blue paint and throw themselves at canvases. Victor Vasarely invented Op-Art by designing sophisticated optical patterns. Artists of the Fluxus movement such as Ben Vautier incorporated graffiti and found objects into their work. Niki de Saint Phalle created bloated and vibrant plastic figures. Arman gathered together found objects in boxed or resin-coated assemblages, and César Baldaccini produced a series of large compressed object-sculptures. César Baldaccini was a prominent French sculptor of the 1960s, who created large waste sculptures by compressing discarded materials like automobiles, metal, rubbish, and domestic objects.

In May 1968, the radical youth movement, through their atelier populaire, produced a great deal of poster-art protesting the moribund policies of president Charles de Gaulle.

Many contemporary artists continue to be haunted by the horrors of the Second World War and the specter of the Holocaust. Christian Boltanski's harrowing installations of the lost and the anonymous are particularly powerful.

French and Western Art museums of France

In Paris

 
 Musée du Louvre
 Musée d'Orsay
 Musée National d'Art Moderne
 Musée de Cluny
 Musée d'Art Moderne de la Ville de Paris
 Petit Palais
 Musée Picasso
 Musée Rodin
 Musée de l'Orangerie
 Musée Zadkine
 Musée Maillol
 Musée Bourdelle
 Musée Gustave Moreau
 Musée Jacquemart-André
 Musée national Eugène Delacroix
 Musée national Jean-Jacques Henner
 Musée Marmottan Monet
 Musée des Arts Décoratifs, Paris
 Musée Nissim de Camondo
 Musée Cognacq-Jay
 Musée Carnavalet

Near Paris
 Musée Condé in Chantilly
 Musée des Beaux-Arts de Chartres in Chartres
 Musée de la Renaissance in Écouen
 Musée d'archéologie nationale in Saint-Germain-en-Laye
 Musée départemental Maurice Denis "The Priory" in Saint-Germain-en-Laye
 Musée d'art et d'archéologie de Senlis in Senlis
 Sèvres - Musée de la céramique in Sèvres

Outside Paris

Major museums

(alphabetically by city)
Musée Faure in Aix-les-Bains
Musée Granet in Aix-en-Provence
Musée Toulouse-Lautrec in Albi
Musée de Picardie in Amiens
Musée de l'Arles et de la Provence antiques in Arles
Musée du Petit Palais in Avignon
Fondation Calvet in Avignon
Musée Albert-André in Bagnols-sur-Cèze
Musée Bonnat in Bayonne
Musée des Beaux-Arts et d'archéologie de Besançon in Besançon
Musée Fernand Léger in Biot, Alpes-Maritimes
Musée des beaux-arts de Bordeaux in Bordeaux
Musée des Beaux-Arts de Caen in Caen
Goya Museum in Castres
Musée d'Art Moderne de Céret in Céret
Musée d'art Roger-Quilliot in Clermont-Ferrand
Unterlinden Museum in Colmar
Musée des Beaux-Arts de Dijon in Dijon
Musée départemental d'Art ancien et contemporain in Épinal
Jacquemart-André museum in Fontaine-Chaalis
Musée de Grenoble in Grenoble
Grenoble Archaeological Museum in Grenoble
Musée Matisse in Le Cateau-Cambrésis
Musée des Beaux-Arts André-Malraux in Le Havre
Palais des Beaux-Arts de Lille in Lille
Musée des beaux-arts de Lyon in Lyon
Musée gallo-romain in Lyon
Musée des beaux-arts de Marseille in Marseille
Musée Cantini in Marseille
Museums of Metz in Metz
Centre Pompidou-Metz in Metz
Musée Ingres in Montauban
Musée Fabre in Montpellier
Château de Montsoreau-Museum of Contemporary Art in Montsoreau
Musée des Beaux-Arts de Nancy in Nancy
Musée de l'École de Nancy in Nancy
Musée Lorrain in Nancy
Musée des Beaux-Arts de Nantes in Nantes
Musée des Beaux-Arts in Nice
Musée national Message Biblique Marc Chagall in Nice
Musée archéologique de Nîmes in Nîmes
Musée Camille Claudel in Nogent-sur-Seine
Musée des Beaux-Arts de Reims in Reims
Palais du Tau in Reims
Musée des Beaux-Arts de Rennes in Rennes
Musée des Beaux-Arts de Rouen in Rouen
Musée d'art moderne de Saint-Étienne in Saint-Étienne
Fondation Maeght in Saint-Paul, Alpes-Maritimes
Musée des Beaux-Arts de Strasbourg in Strasbourg
Musée d'art moderne et contemporain of Strasbourg in Strasbourg
Musée de l’Œuvre Notre-Dame in Strasbourg
Musée des Arts décoratifs, Strasbourg in Strasbourg
Musée des Augustins in Toulouse
Musée Saint-Raymond in Toulouse
Fondation Bemberg in Toulouse

Other museums
(alphabetically by city)
Musée des Beaux-Arts de Brest in Brest
Musée Théodore Deck et des pays du Florival in Guebwiller
Musée historique de Haguenau in Haguenau
Musée Eugène Boudin in Honfleur
Musée Crozatier in Le Puy-en-Velay
Musée des Beaux-Arts de Libourne in Libourne
Musée Girodet in Montargis
Musée des Beaux-Arts de Mulhouse in Mulhouse
Musée des Beaux-Arts de Nîmes in Nîmes
Musée des Beaux-Arts de Pau in Pau
Musée Hyacinthe Rigaud in Perpignan
Musée des Beaux-Arts de Pont-Aven in Pont-Aven
La Piscine Museum in Roubaix
Musée Paul-Dupuy in Toulouse
Musée des Beaux-Arts de Valenciennes in Valenciennes

Textile and tapestry museums
(alphabetically by city)
Musée des tapisseries in Aix-en-Provence
Château d'Angers in Angers
Musée de la tapisserie de Bayeux in Bayeux
Musée des Tissus et des Arts décoratifs in Lyon
Musée de l'impression sur étoffes in Mulhouse
Musée Galliera in Paris
Gobelins Manufactory in Paris
Musée du papier peint in Rixheim

Vocabulary
French words and expressions dealing with the arts:
 peintre — painter
 peinture à l'huile — oil painting
 tableau — painting
 toile — canvas
 gravure — print
 dessin — drawing
 aquarelle — watercolor
 croquis — sketch
 ébauche — draft
 crayon — pencil
 paysage — landscape
 nature morte — still life
 la peinture d'histoire — History painting, see Hierarchy of genres
 tapisserie – tapestry
 vitrail – stained glass

See also
 List of French artists
 For information about French literature, see: French literature
 For information about French history, see: History of France
 For other topics on French culture, see: French culture

References and further reading
 Anthony Blunt: Art and Architecture in France 1500–1700. .
 André Chastel. French Art Vol I: Prehistory to the Middle Ages. .
 André Chastel. French Art Vol II: The Renaissance. .
 André Chastel. French Art Vol III: The Ancient Régime. .
 French Art at the Saint Louis Art Museum

Specific